Riyadh railway station is the main railway station in Riyadh, Saudi Arabia.It is located in the Sinaiyah Qadeem district, and is the western terminus of the Dammam–Riyadh Line.

The station was designed by Italian architect Lucio Barbera in 1978 and was opened for public service in 1981. The station's design was inspired by the architecture of some mosques along the Mediterranean Sea. The building comprises the main lobby from which extends two wings. The wings, enclose the railway platforms. The roof is made from prefabricated, pre-stressed beams. The exterior is clad in local limestone. The style and decoration of the building uses elements such as triangular openings to construct windows and arcades and parapets with rectangular steps, elements bearing a resemblance to Nejd architecture but also common in other Arab architecture. The station includes a main concourse, ticket area, and platform area.

The stations in Riyadh, Dammam, and Hofuf were all designed by Lucio Barbera and share similar design.

References

1981 establishments in Saudi Arabia
Railway stations opened in 1981
Railway stations in Saudi Arabia
Buildings and structures in Riyadh
Transport in Riyadh